Joseph Alexander Dunand Jr. (born September 20, 1995) is an American professional baseball infielder in the Atlanta Braves organization. He made his MLB debut in 2022 for the Miami Marlins.

Amateur career
Dunand attended Gulliver Preparatory School in Miami, Florida. After his senior year, he was drafted by the Cleveland Indians in the 35th round of the 2014 MLB draft. He did not sign, instead enrolling at North Carolina State University. He played college baseball as a shortstop for the NC State Wolfpack. In 2016, he played collegiate summer baseball with the Harwich Mariners of the Cape Cod Baseball League, where he was named a league all-star. In 2017, his junior year, he hit .289 with 16 home runs.

Professional career

Miami Marlins
The Miami Marlins selected Dunand with the 51st overall selection of the 2017 Major League Baseball draft. Dunand signed with the Marlins, receiving a $1.2 million signing bonus. He made his professional debut that year and spent his first professional season with both the Jupiter Hammerheads and the GCL Marlins, slashing .370/.471/.667 with one home run and five doubles in eight games between the two teams.

Dunand began 2018 with Jupiter. After batting .263 with seven home runs and 42 RBIs in 66 games, he was promoted to the Jacksonville Jumbo Shrimp. He finished the year with Jacksonville, hitting .212 with seven home runs and 28 RBIs in 61 games. He returned to Jacksonville for the 2019 season, slashing .242/.314/.333 with five home runs and 42 RBIs over 130 games. He did not play a minor league game in 2020 due to the cancellation of the minor league season caused by the COVID-19 pandemic. In 2021, Dunand returned to play with Jacksonville with whom he batted .201 with eight home runs and 32 RBIs over 64 games.

On May 7, 2022, Dunand was selected to the major league roster as a COVID replacement. He made his major league debut that night and hit a home run in his first at bat. The Marlins designated him for assignment on May 29.

Atlanta Braves
The Atlanta Braves claimed Dunand off of waivers on June 1. On June 10, the Braves designated Dunand for assignment. On June 12, Dunand cleared waivers and was sent outright to the Triple-A Gwinnett Stripers.

Personal life
Dunand's uncle is former MLB All-Star, Alex Rodriguez.

References

External links

1995 births
Living people
Baseball players from Miami
Major League Baseball infielders
Miami Marlins players
NC State Wolfpack baseball players
Harwich Mariners players
Gulf Coast Marlins players
Jupiter Hammerheads players
Jacksonville Jumbo Shrimp players
Leones del Escogido players